was one of the four main Edo period publishing houses of the , also known as , that depict the port city of Nagasaki, the Dutch and Chinese who frequented it, and other foreign curiosities such as exotic fauna and Dutch and Chinese ships. Three different prints are known from Hariya, with subject matter that relates to the Dutch residents of Dejima and to Tōjin yashiki, the city's so-called "Chinese factory".

Name
There it is defined as "that which makes needles for sewing, also, the store or establishment where these are sold". The word hariya also features in Saikaku's 1688 ukiyo-zōshi , as a byword for travel: "it's when you can slip in talk of needle shops (hariya) and ink brushes that you're really attuned to the mindset of someone used to life on the road". One  appears in the records of Nagasaki temple ; his death in Hōreki 4 (1754) would make him a plausible candidate, since the known prints are understood to date from the years to 1750.

Surviving prints
Three different prints are known. When C. R. Boxer was writing, the Hollander was unique, with two prints of each of the other two known. A set of all three may now be found at Kobe City Museum although, judging from the similar later issues by other houses based on these the earliest prints, there may originally have been also a fourth, of a Dutch ship. The prints are hand-coloured, using a brush and red, yellow, brown, and blue pigments, over the printed ink sumi-zuri.

Picture of a Dutchman

Entitled , the print shows a red-haired Dutch man with a long clay smoking pipe (cf. kiseru) and a walking cane, accompanied by a Javanese servant with a Japanese-style umbrella, and a sailor carrying a tray with a flask and a goblet, perhaps for wine. C. R. Boxer identifies "Asiatic influence" in the man's coat, suggesting local or Chinese tailoring.

Chinaman

Picture of a Chinese Ship

Entitled , the print shows the vessel and nine of her crew, accompanied by thirteen lines of text with details as to the ship's size and complement and distances from Japan to locations in China.

Related paintings and prints

See also
 Woodblock printing in Japan
 Dutch East India Company
 Akita ranga
 Red seal ships
 Jagatara-bumi

Notes

References

Further reading
 
 
 
 </ref>

External links
 Collected Nagasaki Prints by Nagami Tokutarō (1926) (National Diet Library) 

Nagasaki
Japanese art